Lozotaeniodes formosana is a moth of the family Tortricidae. It is found in Central Europe.

The wingspan is 20–26 mm. The moth flies from June to August.

The larvae feed on Scots pine.

References

Moths described in 1830
Tortricidae of Europe
Archipini